Rob Moody also known professionally by his stage name Robelinda or Robelinda2 (born 23 November 1977) is an Australian YouTuber, cricket enthusiast, freestyle archive collector, editor and guitarist. He is well known in the cricketing circles especially among the ardent cricket fans for his huge collection of old cricket content and coverage and videos. He owns and runs a YouTube channel titled ‘’’Roblinda2’’ which he uses to upload several cricket footages and he is also often called by the name of his YouTube channel than his real name. His YouTube channel Robelinda2 is also regarded as the largest ever cricket archival channel in the world.
It is also believed that he in fact has a large collection of cricket archives in his possession than the combined videos possessed by the International Cricket Council and other respective cricket boards.

Robelinda2 is also often deemed as the most sought-after YouTube cricket channel over the years. Some analysts, experts and critics consider him as someone who had contributed immensely to the prosperity and growth of cricket way beyond the efforts of global cricketing body, International Cricket Council. He is also considered as cricket's greatest librarian and also fondly remembered as cricket's YouTube hero. As of February 2022, he has approximately 1.01 million subscribers.

Career 
He had the knack of recording live cricket matches which were broadcast on television virtually onto video tapes from his young age since the 1980s. He first recorded a cricket match to video tape in 1982–83 Australian cricket season which included the Ashes at the age of five. He then switched to DVDs from video tapes to record live cricket matches in 1990s. He also then proceeded towards converting them to hard disks to suit the technological evolution.
He has over 300 videotapes, 25000 DVDs and 60 hard drives holding a grand total of whopping 100 Terabytes of footage.

He initially started the idea of sharing archived videos on YouTube by uploading some random Sheffield Shield highlights on YouTube on the request of his online friend.

He created his first YouTube Channel titled robelinda on 7 November 2010 but he later opened a new channel named as robelinda2 due to the difficulties he had to deal with when uploading long videos after a few months of time. He started uploading cricket content from 1980s related to Australian cricket in YouTube and also went onto upload cricket videos related to other nations afterwards.

The video footage which he shared about the century scored by former Australian cricketer Greg Blewett against England in one of the test matches way back in 1998 was the first real breakthrough behind the origin story of his YouTube channel. The video he posted about David Saker’s half volley bouncer to Jeff Vaughan in a test match on 10 November 2010 had raked the most number of YouTube views for any YouTube video on his channel.

He is also highly known for uploading rare cricket videos from obscure matches which are in fact not even broadcast as highlights in television. He revealed that 90 percent of the views on his YouTube channel comes from India. He was also approached by renowned cricket archives of famed institutions and also by former as well as current international cricketers through social media platforms.

His videos at times came under scrutiny over possible copyright strikes and claims but he was cleared of involving in any copyright infringement by ICC and Cricket Australia.

In March 2020, he received warnings from the International Cricket Council citing copyright violations and ICC urged him to immediately delete the footages from any ICC event from 1992 onwards including the 1992 Cricket World Cup, 1996 Cricket World Cup, 1999 Cricket World Cup. 2002 ICC Champions Trophy, 2003 Cricket World Cup, 2004 ICC Champions Trophy and 2006 ICC Champions Trophy. ICC initially warned of severe consequences if he failed to delete those video footages and ICC cautioned him that he would be risking himself for a formal action through YouTube and his account with the probability of being closed down. ICC suggested him to delete just over 100 cricket videos and later stated that it did not have any motives of closing his channel. This comes after ICC had announced overnight that it was planning to release its 45-year-old archive of match footage highlights to its broadcast partners and social media partners.

On 16 June 2020, his cricket video library was temporarily shut down by Twitter due to copyright concerns.

However, Cricket Australia came to his rescue insisting that he was sent an infringement notice due to an error by an agency.

He was largely responsible in providing a glimmer of hope to cricket audiences who were deprived of live international matches ever since the outbreak of COVID-19 pandemic.

His cricket related videos became more popular and viral among cricket fans especially during the onset of the pandemic when the international cricket was brought to a standstill. As of 2021, his YouTube channel saw a rapid spike in subscribers and viewers with over 200, 000 subscribers and 249 million views for his videos since the pandemic induced lockdowns.

ESPN Cricinfo journalist Daniel Brettig in a tweet quoted saying "This guy doesn't profit from what he has done, brilliantly for years. There is only global demand for what he does because the world's broadcasters and boards have failed miserably to do anything serious about making their archives available to public.

A social media campaign was launched by Adam Collins and Geoff Lemon from The Final Word podcast in support of his voluntary services for the upliftment of the game and also demanded an Order of Australia honour for him in recognition of his services for the betterment of the sport.

He claims that he never makes money out of the YouTube content and he insists that he uploads cricket videos solely with the intention of fun and entertainment purposes which he also considers as a side hustle, a dream passion and a hobby for time pass.

He is a guitarist by profession and also teaches both electric guitar and acoustic steel-string guitar at the Modern Guitar Tuition in Box Hill, Melbourne. He also plays guitar and saxophone for Royal Caribbean cruises with The Australian INXS Show.

References 

1977 births
Living people
Australian YouTubers
Sports YouTubers
Australian guitarists